The Malaysia men's national squash team represents Malaysia in international squash team competitions, and is governed by Squash Racquets Association Of Malaysia.

Since 1967, Malaysia has participated in six quarter finals of the World Squash Team Open.

Current team
 Ng Eain Yow
 Ivan Yuen
 Addeen Idrakie
 Mohd Syafiq Kamal
 Ong Sai Hung

Results

World Team Squash Championships

Asian Squash Team Championships

See also 
 Squash Racquets Association Of Malaysia
 World Team Squash Championships
 Malaysia women's national squash team

References 

Squash teams
Men's national squash teams
Squash
Squash in Malaysia
Men's sport in Malaysia